Yelp is an Internet search and review service.

Yelp may also refer to:

 Yelp (sound), a vocalization made by canines, other animals and humans
 Yelp (software), the help-reading application in the GNOME desktop environment
 yelp, a type of sound that can be made by a alarm or emergency vehicle siren